Ayodele Olofintuade is a Nigerian writer, journalist, and feminist. She identifies as queer and non-binary in Nigeria, which is an anti-LGBTQ country.

Biography

Born in Ibadan, Nigeria, Olofintuade grew up between Lagos, Ibadan and Abeokuta. They are a self-supporting, full-time writer whose works are focused primarily on feminism in Africa, Yorùbá spirituality (cutting across Africa and the Diaspora) the Nigerian LGBTQ community, and gender non-conforming persons in Nigeria. Olofintuade has two children.

Writing 
Their first major work of literature was Eno's Story (2010), a children's story published by Cassava Republic Press and shortlisted for the Nigeria Prize for Literature in 2011. It addressed the issue of child-trafficking that has been plaguing Nigeria for a long time.

Their first major article on LGBTQ persons in Nigeria, The A-B-C of Sexuality (2014) on NigeriansTalk, was published immediately after the passage of the Same Sex Marriage Act of 2013 as part of the advocacy tools for the promulgation of the law. It was around this same time they also published their first major serialised novella, Adunni: The Beautiful Ones Have not yet Died (2014) on Brittle Paper, in which some of the characters were queer.

Olofintuade writes both for adults and children, especially children from disadvantaged areas. She is also an activist. Her first book, in 2011, was shortlisted for the Nigeria Prize for Literature. She has had her work published in numerous magazines and journals in Nigeria, including NigeriansTalk and Anathema. Olofintuade is also the managing director of a website about the negative impact of inequality.

Olofintuade's deep knowledge of Yorùbá spirituality and culture means that they are an important go-to for younger artists. With Laipo Read, they provide educational support for children from basic to secondary-school level.

Bibliography

 Eno's Story (Cassava Republic, 2010)
 Lakiriboto Chronicles 
  The Whirlwind 
 Adunni: The Beautiful One Has not Yet Died 
 King of the Heap 
 King of the Heap Learns to Read 
 Children of the Rainbow

References

Living people
Nigerian women writers
Writers from Ibadan
Year of birth missing (living people)
Nigerian feminists
21st-century Nigerian LGBT people
Nigerian non-binary people